KwaZulu-Natal is one of the nine multi-member constituencies of the National Assembly of South Africa, the lower house of the Parliament of South Africa, the national legislature of South Africa. The constituency was established in 1994 when the National Assembly was established by the Interim Constitution following the end of Apartheid. It is conterminous with the province of KwaZulu-Natal. The constituency currently elects 41 of the 400 members of the National Assembly using the closed party-list proportional representation electoral system. At the 2019 general election it had 5,524,666 registered electors.

Electoral system
KwaZulu-Natal currently elects 41 of the 400 members of the National Assembly using the closed party-list proportional representation electoral system. Constituency seats are allocated using the largest remainder method with a Droop quota.

Election results

Summary

Detailed

2019
Results of the 2019 general election held on 8 May 2019:

The following candidates were elected:
Elphas Buthelezi (IFP), Russel Cebekhulu (IFP), Sibongiseni Maxwell Dhlomo (ANC), Mervyn Dirks (ANC), Dorah Dunana Dlamini (ANC), Nomalungelo Gina (ANC), Hlanganani Gumbi (DA), Sibusiso Nigel Gumede (ANC), Magdalena Hlengwa (IFP), Bavelile Hlongwa (ANC), Haniff Hoosen (DA), John Jeffery (ANC), Peter Keetse (EFF), Makoti Khawula (EFF), Alf Lees (DA), Regina Mina Mpontseng Lesoma (ANC), Dean Macpherson (DA), Madimetja Lorence Matsetela (EFF), Thembeka Vuyisile Buyisile Mchunu (ANC), Sibusiso Welcome Mdabe (ANC),  Jabulile Cynthia Nightingale Mkhwanazi (ANC), Mmabatho Mokause (EFF), Alice Mthembu (ANC), Ernest Myeni (ANC), Sibongiseni Ngcobo (DA), Siphosethu Ngcobo (IFP), Xolani Ngwezi (IFP), Nobuhle Pamela Nkabane (ANC), Eric Makhosini Nkosi (ANC), Makhoni Maria Ntuli (ANC), Mthokozisi Nxumalo (IFP), Njabulo Nzuza (ANC), Lizzie Fikelephi Shabalala (ANC), Nomvuzo Shabalala (ANC), Mzwakhe Sibisi (NFP), Duduzile Patricia Sibiya (ANC), Hannah Winkler (DA), Cyril Xaba (ANC), Beauty Thulani Zibula (ANC), Audrey Zuma (ANC) and Thandiwe Zungu (ANC).

2014
Results of the 2014 general election held on 7 May 2014:

The following candidates were elected:
Simphiwe Donatus Bekwa (ANC), Phumzile Bhengu (ANC), Trevor John Bonhomme (ANC), Tim Brauteseth (DA), Bheki Cele (ANC), Mosie Antony Cele (ANC), Mervyn Dirks (ANC), Bongekile Jabulile Dlomo (ANC), Zephroma Sizani Dlamini-Dubazana (ANC), Dennis Dumisani Gamede (ANC), Ndabakayise Erasmus Gcwabaza (ANC), Nomalungelo Gina (ANC), Donald Mlindwa Gumede (ANC), Mkhuleko Hlengwa (IFP), John Jeffery (ANC), Sandy Kalyan (DA), Makoti Khawula (EFF), Makhosi Khoza (ANC), Luwellyn Landers (ANC), Regina Mina Mpontseng Lesoma (ANC), Sahlulele Luzipo (ANC), Mandlenkosi Mabika (NFP), Dean Macpherson (DA), Celiwe Qhamkile Madlopha (ANC), Nosilivere Winifred Magadla (ANC), Lindiwe Mazibuko (DA), Sibongile Mchunu (ANC), Thandi Cecilia Memela (ANC), Lindiwe Ntombikayise Mjobo (ANC), Lungi Annette Mnganga-Gcabashe (ANC), Mangaqa Albert Mncwango (IFP), Alfred Mkhipheni Mpontshane (IFP), Enock Muzi Mthethwa (ANC), Nhlanhla Nene (ANC), Beatrice Thembekile Ngcobo (ANC), Munzoor Shaik Emam (NFP), Maliyakhe Shelembe (NFP), Narend Singh (IFP), John Steenhuisen (DA) and Barbara Thomson (ANC).

2009
Results of the 2009 general election held on 22 April 2009:

The following candidates were elected:
Arthur Roy Ainslie (ANC), Phumzile Bhengu (ANC), Trevor John Bonhomme (ANC), Gloria Mary Borman (ANC), Russel Cebekhulu (IFP), Zephroma Sizani Dubazana (ANC), Mike Ellis (DA), Ndabakayise Erasmus Gcwabaza (ANC), Nomalungelo Gina (ANC), Donald Mlindwa Gumede (ANC), Shiaan-Bin Huang (ANC), John Jeffery (ANC), Fikile Eunice Khumalo (ANC), Gregory Krumbock (DA), Luwellyn Landers (ANC), Eric James Lucas (IFP), Albertinah Nomathuli Luthuli (ANC), Graham Peter Dalziel Mac Kenzie (COPE), Lindiwe Mazibuko (DA), Mandlenkosi Enock Mbili (ANC), Hlengiwe Christophina Mgabadeli (ANC), Lindiwe Ntombikayise Mjobo (ANC), Langalakhe Nicholas Mkhize (ANC), Nomfundo Ntombenhle Penelope Mkhulusi (ANC), Gareth Morgan (DA), Alfred Mkhipheni Mpontshane (IFP), Hilda Sizakele Msweli (IFP), Enock Muzi Mthethwa (ANC), Lindumusa Bekizitha Gabriel Ndabandaba (ANC), Velaphi Bethuel Ndlovu (IFP), Beatrice Thembekile Ngcobo (ANC), Zwelifile Christopher Ntuli (ANC), Ntombikayise Nomawisile Sibhida (ANC), Narend Singh (IFP), Peter Francis Smith (IFP), Jabu Elsie Sosibo (ANC), Barbara Thomson (ANC), Keith Muntuwenkosi Zondi (IFP) and Bhekizizwe Zeblon Zulu (ANC).

2004
Results of the 2004 general election held on 14 April 2004:

The following candidates were elected:
Arthur Roy Ainslie (ANC), Yusuf Suleman Bhamjee (ANC), Mfuniselwa John Bhengu (IFP), Nozabelo Ruth Bhengu (ANC), Phumzile Bhengu (ANC), Happy Mamlili Blose (ANC), Siyabonga Cwele (ANC), Beauty Nomhle Dambuza (ANC), Cheryllyn Dudley (ACDP), Ebrahim Ismail Ebrahim (ANC), Mike Ellis (DA), Lucky Sifiso Gabela (ANC), Ndabakayise Erasmus Gcwabaza (ANC), Malusi Gigaba (ANC), Shiaan-Bin Huang (ANC), Sandy Kalyan (DA), Dianne Kohler Barnard (DA), Albertinah Nomathuli Luthuli (ANC), Nozizwe Madlala-Routledge (ANC), Makhosazana Mpho Mdlalose (IFP), Zakhele Sipho Mkhize (ANC), Alfred Mkhipheni Mpontshane (IFP), Velaphi Bethuel Ndlovu (IFP), Mzikayise Vincent Ngema (IFP), Bonginkosi Christopher Ngiba (IFP), Makhoni Maria Ntuli (ANC), Samuel Neocleous Nxumalo (ANC), Sunklavathy Rajbally (MF), Usha Roopnarain (IFP), Sybil Anne Seaton (IFP), Mohammed Rafeek Sayedali Shah (DA), Peter Francis Smith (IFP), Temba Ellis Vezi (IFP), Everson Thobigunya Xolo (ANC), Keith Muntuwenkosi Zondi (IFP) and Nhlahla Elijah Zulu (IFP).

1999
Results of the 1999 general election held on 2 June 1999:

1994
Results of the 1994 general election held on between 26 and 29 April 1994:

References

National Assembly constituency
National Assembly of South Africa constituencies
National Assembly of South Africa constituencies established in 1994